The McPherson Merry Macks were a minor league baseball team based in McPherson, Kansas. From 1908 to 1911, the Merry Macks played as members of the Class D level Central Kansas League in 1908 and Kansas State League from 1909 to 1911, hosting home games at the County Fair Association Fairgrounds.

History
Minor league baseball in McPherson, Kansas began in 1908. The McPherson Merry Macs became charter members of the six–team Class D level Central Kansas League. Ending the season with a record of 20–27, the Merry Macks finished their first season in fifth place, playing under managers Earl Burgess, Andy Clawson and Charles Taylor Davis. McPherson finished 9.5 games behind the first place Minneapolis Minnies in the final standings.

On May 26, 1908, at the Athletic Park in Newton, Kansas, the Newton Railroaders and McPherson Merry Macks played a 20–inning game. In a contest lasting 3:15 and ending at 6:45 P.M., Newton defeated McPherson 3–2.

In 1909, the McPherson franchise switched leagues. The Merry Macks became members of the eight–team Class D level Kansas State League. The Arkansas City-Winfield Twins, Great Bend Millers, Hutchinson Salt Packers, Larned Cowboys, Lyons Lions, Newton Railroaders and Wellington Dukes joined McPherson as 1909 league members.

On July 27, 1909, McPherson and the Lyons Lions played a 21–inning game at McPherson. Lyons won the game 2–1 in the contest played in 2:50.

In their first season of Kansas State League play, the 1909 McPherson Merry Macks finished in third place. McPherson ended the season with a 59–37 record, playing under managers Earl Burgess, Andy Clawson and Charles Taylor. In a close race, the Merry Macks finished 1.0 game behind the first place Lyons Lions and 0.5 game behind the 2nd place Hutchinson Salt Packers in the final Kansas State League standings. The league held no playoffs. Jasper Hainsey of the McPherson Merry Macks scored 66 runs to lead the Kansas State League.

Continuing play as members of the 1910 Kansas State League, the McPherson Merry Macks placed second in the eight–team league. The Merry Macks finished the season with a record of 59–52, playing under manager Charles Conklin. The Merry Macks finished 11.0 games behind the first place Hutchinson Salt Packers in the final 1910 standings.

In 1911, the McPherson Merry Macks played their final season, as the Kansas State League folded during the season. On July 11, 1911, the Kansas State League folded and McPherson Merry Macks ended the season with a record of 31–28. The league reportedly disbanded due to crop failures and drought. When the league ceased play, McPherson was in fourth place in the standings. Joseph Harris served as manager, as the Merry Macks finished 8.0 games behind the first place Great Bend Millers in the shortened season.

After the Kansas State League folded in 1911, McPherson, Kansas has not hosted another minor league team.

The ballpark
The McPherson Merry Macks' minor league home ballpark was referenced to have been the County Fair Association Fairgrounds. Constructed in 1905, the fairgrounds reportedly hosted games on a diamond in the middle of the oval for the 1/2 mile oval track, with a new grandstand build behind home plate in 1908 to accommodate the McPherson Merry Macks beginning minor league play. The site today is noted to be home of the historic Light Capital Baseball Diamond, located at 551 South Fisher, McPherson, Kansas.

Timeline

Year–by–year records

Notable alumni
No alumni of the McPherson Merry Macks reached the major leagues.

References

External links
McPherson - Baseball Reference

Defunct minor league baseball teams
Defunct baseball teams in Kansas
Baseball teams disestablished in 1908
Baseball teams established in 1911
Kansas State League teams
McPherson County, Kansas